Eric Halley (3 December 1893 – 17 June 1953) was a South African sports shooter. He competed in two events at the 1924 Summer Olympics.

References

External links
 

1893 births
1953 deaths
South African male sport shooters
Olympic shooters of South Africa
Shooters at the 1924 Summer Olympics
Sportspeople from Dunedin
New Zealand emigrants to South Africa